Hi-Ex (short for the Highlands International Comics Expo) was the name given to a Scottish comics convention held from 2008–2012. It was held early in the year in Eden Court Theatre, Inverness. The organisers were Richmond Clements (editor at FutureQuake Publishing) and Vicky Stonebridge.

The convention was the centre of a range of other events organised to promote comics in the region, including "outreach visits" to schools (involving Kev F. Sutherland), with the help of the Highland Council and Scottish Arts Council, and an exhibition of comic art in Eden Court's gallery.

History 
The idea for the convention emerged from the lack of a major comics convention in the area and a discussion Richmond Clements and Vicky Stonebridge had with Eden Court's Judith Aitken, about possibly bringing in a few guest speakers. Through contacts made because of their involvement with the British small press comics they were able to speak to a wide number of professional comic creators and the event rapidly grew into a full weekend. They also received advice from people with experience in running conventions, including Michael Carroll, who chaired the Irish national science fiction convention, Octocon, and the Comic Expo's Mike Allwood. Hi-Ex has been used by the BBC as an example of how the Internet has helped facilitate developments in the Highlands and Islands. Clements is quoted as saying "Practically the entire event was organized through e-mail."

Northings, the Highlands and Islands Art Journal, described the first convention as "inspirational," and said that "by the end of the weekend I felt like a door had been opened on a whole genre of art that I hadn’t engaged with before." Of those that attended, Gary Erskine declared it a "complete success."

There was no Hi-Ex convention in 2011 due to lack of sponsorship; the show returned in 2012. Hi-Ex 2013 was scheduled for 6–7 April 2013, at Eden Court Theatre, Inverness, but was canceled.

Dates and locations

References

External links

 Richmond Clement's blog
 Vicky Stonebridge
 Hi-Ex in the Highlands, Forbidden Planet, 3 February 2008
Hi-Ex photographs on Flickr
The Scottish Falsetto Sock Puppet Theatre's guide to Hi-Ex, by Kev F. Sutherland
The Predator's footage of event
We are Family: A conversation with Vicky Stonebridge, Forbidden Planet, 31 July 2009

British fan conventions
Defunct comics conventions
Culture in Inverness